The Leasburg Diversion Dam is a structure completed in 1907 on the Rio Grande in New Mexico, United States.

Location

The town of Leasburg, now Radium Springs, grew up around Fort Selden, 18 miles north of Las Cruces.  
A diversion dam was built for irrigation purposes built of poles and interwoven with twigs and stones for ballast. 
The Rio Grande Project was authorized on 2 December 1905.
Work began in November 1906.

Leasburg Diversion Dam was the first dam completed on the Rio Grande Project by the United States Bureau of Reclamation. 
By 1908, the Rio Grande was being diverted into the Leasburg Canal to irrigate  of land in the upper Mesilla Valley. 
In 1919 the crest of Leasburg Dam was raised .

References
Citations

Sources

Dams in New Mexico
Buildings and structures in Doña Ana County, New Mexico
Dams completed in 1907
United States local public utility dams
Dams on the Rio Grande
1907 establishments in New Mexico Territory